The Rocklopedia Fakebandica, by T. Mike Childs, is an illustrated encyclopedia of fictional musical groups and musicians, as seen in movies and television. It was officially released November 6, 2004. The book catalogs such better-known fake bands as Spinal Tap, The Blues Brothers, The Rutles, and The Chipmunks, along with dozens of less well known ones. The book takes a light-hearted, humorous approach, often pointing out the discrepancies between the experiences of real bands and musicians and the unlikely adventures fictional ones have.

The book grew out of a website started by the author in 2000. The website includes fictional bands from other sources, such as books and TV commercials, as well as many bands not found in the book.

External links
Official site

2004 non-fiction books
Online encyclopedias
Popular culture books
Encyclopedias of music